Baby Blue Marine is a 1976 American drama film set during World War II that was directed by John D. Hancock and starring Jan-Michael Vincent. The feature film was produced by Aaron Spelling and Leonard Goldberg.

Plot
Marion “Hedge” Hedgepeth, a Marine recruit during World War II, washes out in recruit training in San Diego. He is sent home in an unadorned baby blue uniform, leftover military surplus, as most recruits sent their civilian clothes home, thus the derogatory designation Baby Blue Marine.

Traveling by bus to his home in St. Louis, Hedge meets a Marine Raider veteran at a stopover. The young, battle-scarred, and highly decorated Marine has aged beyond his years with prematurely gray hair. As the Raider does not wish to return to the war, he knocks out Hedge and trades uniforms with him.

Now penniless, with only the Raider uniform for clothing, Hedge hitchhikes towards St. Louis. He enters the idyllic small town of Bidwell, California, below Mount Shasta. His uniform’s decorations and Raider shoulder-sleeve insignia make him a hero to the community, whose own young men are away at the war.

At the local diner, Hedge is befriended by waitress Rose, a recent high-school graduate, and Mr. Elmore, a local who lost his son in the attack on Pearl Harbor. He also meets Army Private Danny Phelps, a local who just finished basic training and is awaiting assignment to the army typing pool.

Rose invites Hedge to stay with her family for a few days, where Hedge bunks with her brother, Barney.  Rose and Hedge fall in love, and he eventually tells her the truth of his story, saying that he has chosen to stay quiet because he does not want the real Raider to get in trouble for deserting.

When three American-born teenaged boys escape from a local Japanese American internment camp, the camp’s small and inexperienced army troop is joined by the locals in searching the woods. Mr. Elmore reminds everyone that these are young American citizens, but some of the locals, particularly Private Phelps, seem hellbent on killing the "Japs".

Hedge finds the boys first, and they admit that they are sick of being unfairly held and are (naively) trying to get home to San Francisco. Phelps spots the scene from a nearby ridge and shoots, hitting Hedge, who falls into the rapids of a rushing mountain stream.  The Japanese-American boys, aided by Mr. Elmore and a repentant Phelps, barely save the heavily bleeding Hedge from drowning. Thinking he might die, Hedge tells Rose to tell everyone his true story.

When the war ends, Hedge returns to Bidwell and Rose, having served as a corporal under General Patton in the U.S. Third Army.

Cast
 Jan-Michael Vincent as Marion
 Glynnis O'Connor as Rose
 Katherine Helmond as Mrs. Hudkins
 Dana Elcar as Sheriff Wenzel
 Bert Remsen as Mr. Hudkins
 Bruno Kirby as Pop Mosley (as B. Kirby Jr.)
 Richard Gere as Raider
 Art Lund as Mr. Elmore
 Michael Conrad as Drill Instructor
 Allan Miller as Capt. Bittman
 Michael LeClair as Barney Hudkins
 Will Seltzer as Pvt. Phelps
 Kenneth Tobey as Buick Driver (as Ken Tobey)
 Lelia Goldoni as Mrs. Townsley
 Marshal Efron as Cook
 Barton Heyman as Barker
 Adam Arkin as Rupe
 Damon Douglas as Dobbs
 Barry Greenberg as Idiot #1
 John Blyth Barrymore as Idiot #2
 John Calvin as Paratrooper
 Richard Narita as Masamura
 Evan C. Kim as Harakawa (as Evan Kim)
 Keone Young as Katsu
 Phyllis Glick as Girl Behind Bus Counter
 William Martel as Bartender
 Warren Burton as Second Serviceman 
 Abraham Alvarez as First Serviceman
 Bill Sorrells as Coach 
 Carole White as Girl On Bus (as Carole Ita White)
 Duncan Gamble as Sailor
 Tita Bell as Girl #1
 Lani O'Grady as Girl #2
 Barbara Dodd as Mother
 Tom Lee McFadden as First Shore Patrolman
 James Carroll as Second Shore Patrolman (as James Lough)

Film locations
Vincent also stars in Tribes, another film that features the Marine Corps.

Reception
Film critic Roger Ebert gave the film 2½ out of 4 stars.

See also
 List of American films of 1976

References

External links
 
 
 
 
 

1976 films
1976 drama films
Films directed by John D. Hancock
Films about the United States Marine Corps
Films scored by Fred Karlin
American World War II films
Columbia Pictures films
Films set in California
American war drama films
1970s English-language films
1970s American films